State Route 142 (SR 142) is a  state highway that runs northwest-southeast in the central part of the U.S. state of Georgia, within portions of Newton, Jasper, Putnam counties.

Route description
SR 142 begins at an intersection with SR 81, north of Covington, in Newton County. It heads southeast to first meet Interstate 20 (I-20) and then U.S. Route 278 (US 278)/SR 12 in Covington. The three routes head east concurrently and cross over the Alcovy River. SR 142 splits off to the southeast and meets SR 11 (Lamar Hays Memorial Parkway). SR 142 continues to the southeast and intersects SR 213 and SR 229 in Newborn. SR 142 and SR 229 run concurrent through town, and then enter Jasper County. After SR 142 splits off to the southeast, it enters Shady Dale, where it intersects SR 83 (Main Street). The highway enters Putnam County and intersects the route of former SR 300 (Glades Road) in Oconee National Forest. SR 142 continues to the southeast, until it meets its eastern terminus, and intersection with SR 16 (Monticello Road) in Willard, which is located west of Eatonton.

History

A $12 million widening project was announced in 2009 with a scheduled completion in 2012.

Major intersections

See also

References

External links

 Georgia Roads (Routes 141 - 160)

142
Transportation in Newton County, Georgia
Transportation in Jasper County, Georgia
Transportation in Putnam County, Georgia